Tsagaankhairkhan (white mountain) is a sum (district) of Uvs Province in western Mongolia.

It is situated in the Khan Khökhii mountains, on the banks of Mondoohei River.

Populated places in Mongolia
Districts of Uvs Province